Jumpman may refer to:

Sports 

Jumpman (logo), based on a silhouette of Michael Jordan and first used on Nike's Air Jordan shoes

Arts 

"Jumpman" (song), the Drake and Future song from What a Time to Be Alive
Jumpman (film), 2018 Russian film
Jumpman (band), British experimental hardcore band

Video games 

Jumpman (video game), an early platform game written by Randy Glover and released by Epyx in 1983
 Jumpman, the original name of the Nintendo character Mario in the 1981 game Donkey Kong